Leiataualesa Taupau Mulipola Oliva (born 1974) is a Samoan politician and former member of the Samoan Parliament. When elected in 2006 he was Samoa's youngest MP.

Oliva was first elected to the Legislative Assembly of Samoa as a Samoan Democratic United Party MP in the 2006 Samoan general election. After the collapse of the SDUP he became a founding member of the Tautua Samoa Party, and in May 2009 was deemed to have resigned his seat by Speaker Tolofuaivalelei Falemoe Leiʻataua. He was reinstated by the Supreme Court in July 2009. In September 2010 he asked to run as a Human Rights Protection Party candidate in the upcoming election. He subsequently lost his seat in the 2011 election.

In July 2020 Oliva announced that he would contest Aiga-ile-tai in the April 2021 election as an HRPP candidate. He was subsequently banished from a number of villages in the constituency for unstated reasons.

References

Living people
Members of the Legislative Assembly of Samoa
Tautua Samoa Party politicians
Samoan Democratic United Party politicians
Human Rights Protection Party politicians
1974 births